James Callum Shaw (born 6 June 1996) is a British road racing cyclist, who currently rides for UCI WorldTeam .

Career

Early life and amateur career
Shaw was born in Nottingham but grew up in the town of Heanor, Derbyshire. When he was six years old, he joined his first cycling club, Heanor Clarion. As a teenager riding for Haribo–Beacon, Shaw won the junior versions of both Kuurne–Brussels–Kuurne and Omloop Het Nieuwsblad. On 26 June, Shaw came third in the Under-23 category of the National Road Championships behind Tao Geoghegan Hart and Chris Lawless. After riding a couple of Belgian one-day classics, Shaw was named as one of six riders for the Tour of Britain, his home tour.

Lotto Soudal (2017–2018)
Shaw signed a two-year professional contract for the start of the 2017 season, at the age of 20. His contract was not renewed at the end of the 2018 season.

Major results

2014
 1st Kuurne–Brussels–Kuurne Juniores
 1st Omloop Het Nieuwsblad voor Junioren
2016
 3rd Road race, National Under–23 Road Championships
 3rd Flèche Ardennaise
 5th Liège–Bastogne–Liège Espoirs
 10th Overall Tour de Normandie
 10th Dwars door de Vlaamse Ardennen
2018
 10th Road race, UCI Road World Under–23 Championships
2019
 1st  Overall Tour of the Reservoir
1st Stage 2
 1st Ryedale GP
 4th Overall Tour du Loir-et-Cher
 5th Overall Tour de Yorkshire
 10th Overall Szlakiem Walk Majora Hubala
 10th Tokyo 2020 Test Event
2021
 3rd Time trial, National Road Championships
 5th Overall Tour of Norway
 5th Overall Tour of Slovenia
2022
 3rd Time trial, National Road Championships
 6th Overall Tour de Wallonie
 9th Overall Tour des Alpes-Maritimes et du Var

Grand Tour general classification results timeline
Sources:

References

External links
 

1996 births
Living people
British male cyclists
Sportspeople from Nottingham